Saber Boukemouche (born 20 April 1992) is an Algerian athlete who specialises in the 400 metres hurdles. He represented his country at the 2015 World Championships in Beijing without qualifying for the semifinals.

His personal best in the event is 49.43 seconds set in Algiers in 2015.

International competitions

1Did not start in the final

References

1992 births
Living people
Algerian male hurdlers
World Athletics Championships athletes for Algeria
Athletes (track and field) at the 2015 African Games
Athletes (track and field) at the 2018 Mediterranean Games
Athletes (track and field) at the 2022 Mediterranean Games
Mediterranean Games bronze medalists for Algeria
Mediterranean Games medalists in athletics
Competitors at the 2015 Summer Universiade
Competitors at the 2017 Summer Universiade
African Games competitors for Algeria
21st-century Algerian people